Xayar County, also Shayar County or, from Mandarin Chinese, Shaya, is a county in the Xinjiang Uyghur Autonomous Region and is under the administration of the Aqsu Prefecture. According to the 2004 census it has a population of 210,000.

History
In 1902, Xayar County was established.

In March 1964, Tarim Farm was founded. In 1970, Tarim Farm was renamed Nong Yi Shi 15th Regiment. In 1973, Nong Yi Shi 15th Regiment was renamed Third Laogai Detachment. As of 1982, the prison had a cotton processing factory. In 1985, Third Laogai Detachment was renamed Tarim Laogai Detachment. In 1994, Tarim Laogai Detachment was renamed Tarim Prison.

On July 15, 1996, a prison rebellion in Xayar County led to the deaths of fifteen.

In 1998, Tarim Prison was renamed Xayar Prison.

In June 2008, Gezqum Township (Gaizikumu) was established. On December 30, 2008, the township's government started operation.

In 2011, Yantaqsheher Township (Yangtakexiehai'er) was established.

In 2012, Xadadong (Hadedun) was established. On February 25, 2013, the town's government started operation.

According to Radio Free Asia, in January 2014 after Uyghur residents were reportedly forced to bow to a flag of China before worshipping at Xaniqa mosque in Yengimehelle township, three Uyghur youths burned the flag. Raids on Uyghur homes searching for the youths continued into 2015. Authorities warned residents not to discuss the flagburning incident.

On May 26, 2014, Gulbagh (Gulebage), then a township, was made a town.

In an Agence France-Presse report, between 2017 and 2019, three cemeteries in Xayar County were among dozens of Uyghur cemeteries destroyed in Xinjiang. The unearthed human bones from the cemeteries in Xayar County were discarded.

Administrative divisions
, Xayar County included seven towns, four townships and four other areas:

Towns ( / ):
Xayar Town (Shayar, Shaya;  / ), Toyboldi (Tuoyi Baoledi, Tuoyibaoledi;  / , formerly ), Qizilbayraq (Hongqi;  / , formerly ), Yengimehelle (Yingmaili;  / , formerly ), Xadadong (Hadedun;  / ), Gülbag (Gulebage, Gulbagh;  / , formerly ), Qaylor (Hailou;  / , formerly )

Townships ( / ):
 Nurbagh Township (Nu'erbage;  / ), Tarim Township (Talimu;  / ), Gezqum Township (Gaizikumu;  / ), Yantaqsheher Township (Yangtakexiehai'er;  / )

Other areas
 Xinken Farm, No. 2 Pasture, Xayar Prison (Xinjiang Shaya Prison), Xayar County Industrial Zone

Climate

Economy
Agriculture and animal husbandry are equally strong in the county. Agricultural products include wheat, corn and cotton as well as melons, yema, walnut, velvet antler, muskrat, and licorice root. The county is the main location for Sanbei Sheep lambskin production. Industries include knitting, leather making, food processing and others.

The seven major speciality products of the county include Tarim Huyang, cotton, red deer, dates, Karakul sheep, salt cedar, and sword-leaf dogbane.

, there was about 45,900 acres (303,747 mu) of cultivated land in Xayar.

Demographics 

As of 2015, 230,129 of the 274,382 residents of the county were Uyghur, 41,463 were Han Chinese and 2,790 were from other ethnic groups.

Most residents of Xayar are Muslim Uyghurs.

As of 1999, 84.05% of the population of Xayar (Shaya) County was Uyghur and 14.6% of the population was Han Chinese.

Transportation
 China National Highway 217

Historical maps
Historical English-language maps including Xayar:

Notes

References

County-level divisions of Xinjiang
Aksu Prefecture